The Men's 4 x 100 metres relay event at the 2013 European Athletics U23 Championships was held in Tampere, Finland, at Ratina Stadium on 14 July.

Medalists

†: Competed only in heat.

Results

Final
14 July 2013 / 17:20

Heats
Qualified: First 3 in each heat (Q) and 2 best performers (q) advance to the Final

Summary

Details

Heat 1
14 July 2013 / 15:05

Heat 2
14 July 2013 / 15:15

Participation
According to an unofficial count, 59 athletes from 14 countries participated in the event.

References

4 x 100 metres relay
Relays at the European Athletics U23 Championships